Ronald Carter (born 11 July 1938) is a British former sports shooter. He competed in the trap event at the 1972 Summer Olympics.

References

1938 births
Living people
British male sport shooters
Olympic shooters of Great Britain
Shooters at the 1972 Summer Olympics
Place of birth missing (living people)